The Harebell Formation is a Mesozoic geologic formation in Wyoming. Dinosaur remains diagnostic to the genus level are among the fossils that have been recovered from the formation.

Paleofauna

 ? Leptoceratops sp. (neoceratopsia indet)
 Saurexallopus loevei
 Prodesmodon sp.
 Ceratopsidae ident.
 Iguanodontidae ident.
 ? Nodosauridae
 Tyrannosauridae ident. (identified as Deinodontidae)
 Ornithischia ident.
 Amia sp.
 Crocodylidae ident.

See also

 List of dinosaur-bearing rock formations
 List of stratigraphic units with few dinosaur genera

Footnotes

References
 Weishampel, David B.; Dodson, Peter; and Osmólska, Halszka (eds.): The Dinosauria, 2nd, Berkeley: University of California Press. 861 pp. .

Geologic formations of Wyoming
Maastrichtian Stage of North America
Cretaceous geology of Wyoming